Poot Lorlek (born Taweesak Pipatkul; January 1, 1952 – June 1, 2020) was a Thai Muay Thai kickboxer and professional boxer who competed in the 1970s. He is recognized as one of the greatest Muay Thai kickboxers of all time.

Career
Lorlek born in Palian District, Trang Province in southern Thailand. He first practiced Muay Thai at the age of 15 from a Muay Thai gym in his native province. He became very famous in the 1970s, especially in the mid-1970s, having fought with many top-line Muay Thai kickboxers, such as Saensak Muangsurin, Kongdej Lukbangplasroi, Vicharnnoi Porntawee, Pudpadnoi Worawut, Sagat Petchyindee, Satanfah Sor.Prateep, Sirimongkol Luksiripat, etc.

In a span of about 10 years, he had about 80 fights, without ever being knocked down or knocked out. He was knocked down by Sirimongkol Luksiripat once in 1973, but the referee didn't count. He won the fight on points.

For professional boxing, he was Thailand's lightweight champion in 1975 and was ranked in junior welterweight of the World Boxing Association (WBA).

Retirement and death
After retirement, he returned to open a Muay Thai gym in Trang Province under the name "Muay Thai Gym Poot Lorlek" in 2011. Poot Lorlek died on June 1, 2020, at around 09.00 p.m. of heart failure, after heart surgery at Songklanagarind Hospital, Hat Yai. He was 68 years old.

Titles and accomplishments
Muay Thai
 1971 Lumpinee Stadium Junior featherweight Champion (122 lbs)

Boxing
1975 Thailand Lightweight Champion (135 lbs)

Awards
 1974 King's Fighter of the Year
 1975 Fight of the Year (vs Vicharnnoi Porntawee)
 2014 Siam Sport Awards Hall of Fame (Muay Thai)
 Muay Siam Magazine Fighter of the Century

Professional boxing record

Muay Thai record

|- style="text-align:center; background:#c5d2ea;"
|1979-01-23
|Draw
| align="left" | Satanfah Sor.Prateep
|Ubon Boxing Stadium
|Ubon Ratchathani, Thailand
|Decision
|5
|3:00

|-  style="background:#cfc;"
| 1978- || Win ||align=left| Siangnow Bangprachan ||  || Bangkok, Thailand || Decision || 5 || 3:00

|-  style="background:#cfc;"
| 1977- || Win ||align=left| Kraipetch Sor.Prateep ||  || Lampang, Thailand || Decision || 5 || 3:00

|-  style="background:#fbb;"
| 1977- || Loss||align=left| Posai Sitiboonlert || || Hat Yai, Thailand || ||  ||

|-  style="background:#fbb;"
| 1977-09-23 || Loss ||align=left| Phongdetnoi Prasophchai || Lumpinee Stadium || Bangkok, Thailand || Decision || 5 || 3:00

|-  style="background:#cfc;"
| 1977-08-19 || Win ||align=left| Genshu Igari || Lumpinee Stadium || Bangkok, Thailand || KO (Left High Kick)|| 1 ||

|-  style="background:#cfc;"
| 1977-07-29 || Win ||align=left| Mehmood Lukbothong || Hat Yai Boxing Stadium || Hat Yai, Thailand || Decision|| 5 ||3:00

|-  style="background:#fbb;"
| 1977-05-27 || Loss ||align=left| Wichit Lukbangplasoi || Lumpinee Stadium || Bangkok, Thailand || Decision || 5 || 3:00

|-  style="background:#fbb;"
| 1977-04-08 || Loss ||align=left| Jitti Muangkhonkaen || Lumpinee Stadium || Bangkok, Thailand || Decision || 5 || 3:00

|-  style="background:#fbb;"
| 1977-03-11 || Loss ||align=left| Posai Sitiboonlert || Lumpinee Stadium || Bangkok, Thailand || Decision || 5 || 3:00
|-
! style=background:white colspan=9 |

|-  style="background:#cfc;"
| 1977- || Win ||align=left| Kongdej Lukbangplasoi|| Lumpinee Stadium || Bangkok, Thailand || Decision || 5 || 3:00

|-  style="background:#cfc;"
| 1976-05-14 || Win||align=left| Neth Saknarong || Rajadamnern Stadium || Bangkok, Thailand || Decision || 5 || 3:00
|-
! style=background:white colspan=9 |

|-  style="background:#fbb;"
| 1976-03-25 || Loss||align=left| Neth Saknarong || Rajadamnern Stadium || Bangkok, Thailand || Decision || 5 || 3:00

|-  style="background:#cfc;"
| 1976-03-02 || Win||align=left| Wichit Lukbangplasoi || Lumpinee Stadium || Bangkok, Thailand || Decision || 5 || 3:00
|-
! style=background:white colspan=9 |
|-  style="background:#cfc;"
| 1975- || Win ||align=left| Bandit Singprakarn || Lumpinee Stadium || Bangkok, Thailand || Decision || 5 || 3:00

|- style="text-align:center; background:#cfc;"
|1975-09-12
|Win
| align="left" | Satanfah Sor.Prateep
|Lumpinee Stadium
|Bangkok, Thailand
|Decision
|5
|3:00

|-  style="background:#cfc;"
| 1975-06-19 || Win ||align=left| Vicharnnoi Porntawee || Rajadamnern Stadium || Bangkok, Thailand || Decision || 5 || 3:00
|-
! style=background:white colspan=9 |

|-  style="background:#cfc;"
| 1975-02-11 || Win||align=left| Wichit Lukbangplasoi || Huamark Stadium || Bangkok, Thailand || Decision || 5 || 3:00

|- style="text-align:center; background:#cfc;"
|1975-01-14
|Win
| align="left" | Satanfah Sor.Prateep
|Lumpinee Stadium
|Bangkok, Thailand
|Decision
|5
|3:00

|-  style="background:#cfc;"
| 1974-10-08 || Win ||align=left| Saensak Muangsurin|| Lumpinee Stadium || Bangkok, Thailand ||Decision || 5 || 3:00
|-
! style=background:white colspan=9 |

|-  style="background:#fbb;"
| 1974-07-12 || Loss ||align=left| Saensak Muangsurin|| Lumpinee Stadium || Bangkok, Thailand || Decision || 5 || 3:00

|-  style="background:#cfc;"
| 1974-05-31 || Win ||align=left| Kongdej Lukbangplasoi|| Lumpinee Stadium || Bangkok, Thailand || Decision || 5 || 3:00

|-  style="background:#cfc;"
| 1974-03-12 || Win ||align=left| Saensak Muangsurin|| Lumpinee Stadium || Bangkok, Thailand || Decision || 5 || 3:00

|-  style="background:#cfc;"
| 1974-02-08 || Win ||align=left| Chuchai Lukpanchama || Lumpinee Stadium || Bangkok, Thailand || Decision || 5 || 3:00

|-  style="background:#cfc;"
| 1973-12-14|| Win ||align=left| Pansak Kiatcharoenchai || Lumpinee Stadium || Bangkok, Thailand || Decision || 5 || 3:00

|-  style="background:#cfc;"
| 1973-09-07|| Win ||align=left| Sirimongkol Luksiripat|| Huamark Stadium || Bangkok, Thailand || Decision || 5 || 3:00
|-
! style=background:white colspan=9 |

|-  style="background:#cfc;"
| 1973-05-11|| Win ||align=left| Muangchon Jeeraphan || Lumpinee Stadium || Bangkok, Thailand || Decision || 5 || 3:00

|-  style="background:#cfc;"
| 1973-02-09|| Win ||align=left| Saensak Muangsurin|| Huamark Stadium || Bangkok, Thailand || Decision || 5 || 3:00

|-  style="background:#cfc;"
| 1972-12-15|| Win ||align=left| Sornnak Kiatvayupak || Lumpinee Stadium || Bangkok, Thailand || Decision || 5 || 3:00

|-  style="background:#cfc;"
| 1972-10-06|| Win ||align=left| Buriram Sumisakawan || Lumpinee Stadium || Bangkok, Thailand || Decision || 5 || 3:00

|-  style="background:#fbb;"
| 1972-09-01 || Loss ||align=left| Burengnong Sakornpitak || Lumpinee Stadium || Bangkok, Thailand || Decision || 5 || 3:00

|-  style="background:#fbb;"
| 1972-08-04 || Loss ||align=left| Denthoranee Muangsurin || Lumpinee Stadium || Bangkok, Thailand || Decision || 5 || 3:00

|-  style="background:#cfc;"
| 1972-06-09|| Win ||align=left| Saengmorakot || Lumpinee Stadium || Bangkok, Thailand || Decision || 5 || 3:00

|-  style="background:#fbb;"
| 1972-04-25 || Loss ||align=left| Vicharnnoi Porntawee || Lumpinee Stadium || Bangkok, Thailand || Decision || 5 || 3:00

|-  style="background:#cfc;"
| 1972-03-14|| Win ||align=left| Chaiyut Sitthibunlert || Lumpinee Stadium || Bangkok, Thailand || Decision || 5 || 3:00

|-  style="background:#cfc;"
| 1972-02-15|| Win ||align=left| Fahsai Thaweechai|| Huamark Stadium || Bangkok, Thailand || Decision || 5 || 3:00

|-  style="background:#fbb;"
| 1971-11-05 || Loss ||align=left| Vicharnnoi Porntawee || Lumpinee Stadium || Bangkok, Thailand || Decision || 5 || 3:00

|-  style="background:#cfc;"
| 1971-08-14 || Win ||align=left| Aswin Jinpinpetch || Lumpinee Stadium || Bangkok, Thailand || Decision || 5 || 3:00

|-  style="background:#cfc;"
| 1971-04-02|| Win ||align=left| Samyan Singsornthong|| Huamark Stadium || Bangkok, Thailand || Decision || 5 || 3:00

|-  style="background:#cfc;"
| 1971-01-29 || Win ||align=left| Samyan Singsornthong|| Lumpinee Stadium || Bangkok, Thailand || Decision || 5 || 3:00
|-
! style=background:white colspan=9 |

|-  style="background:#cfc;"
| 1970-08-28 || Win ||align=left| Adul Keatdara || Lumpinee Stadium || Bangkok, Thailand || KO (Left High Kick)|| 4 ||

|-  style="background:#fbb;"
| 1970-|| Loss ||align=left| Phanomphon || || Bangkok, Thailand || Decision || 5 || 3:00

|-  style="background:#cfc;"
| 1969-06-14|| Win ||align=left| Sirinarong Sakthanine|| Lumpinee Stadium || Bangkok, Thailand || Decision || 5 || 3:00
|-
! style=background:white colspan=9 |

|-  style="background:#cfc;"
| || Win ||align=left| Tanomjit Sukhothai||  || Thailand || Decision || 5 || 3:00
|-
| colspan=9 | Legend:

See more
List of Muay Thai practitioners

References

External links

1952 births
2020 deaths
Thai male Muay Thai practitioners
Muay Thai trainers
Thai male boxers
People from Trang province
Lightweight boxers
Light-welterweight boxers
Lightweight kickboxers